Herrion is a surname. Notable people with the surname include:

Atlas Herrion (born 1980), American football player
Bill Herrion (born 1958), American basketball coach
Thomas Herrion (1981–2005), American football player
Tom Herrion (born 1967), American basketball coach

See also
Herriot